Sigmund Robert Molinari (born Sigismondo Berengario Nicola Molinari; February 22, 1898 – May 31, 1957) was an American politician from New York. Molinari, who served one term in the New York State Assembly, was "the first Italian immigrant to serve in the New York state Assembly."

Life
He was born in Italy the town of Amantea to parents Gaetano Molinari and Mariantonia Perciavalle, and graduated from New York University. Before entering politics, he was a real estate broker on Staten Island. He worked as an appraiser and property manager for the New York City Bureau of Real Estate from 1941 until his election.

He was a member of the New York State Assembly (Richmond Co., 2nd D.) in 1943 and 1944, elected on the Republican ticket. In 1944, he ran for re-election on the Democratic ticket, Molinari but was defeated by Republican Edmund P. Radigan. In 1948, he lost a race for the Republican nomination for the New York State Senate. He ran unsuccessfully for the party's nomination for Staten Island borough president in 1953.

S. Robert Molinari died May 31, 1957 at the age of 59.

He was the father of Guy Molinari (1928-2018), who served in the United States House of Representatives and as borough president of Staten Island; and grandfather of U.S. Representative Susan Molinari (born 1958). He lived in New Dorp, Staten Island.

References

External links
 "S. Robert Molinari" at the Political Graveyard

1898 births
1957 deaths
Republican Party members of the New York State Assembly
Italian emigrants to the United States
20th-century American politicians
Politicians from Staten Island
People from New Dorp, Staten Island
American people of Italian descent